The South Infirmary-Victoria University Hospital is a elective surgical hospital in Cork, County Cork, Ireland. It is part of the South/Southwest Hospital Group.

History
The South Infirmary was established by a catholic charity and officially opened in 1762. Meanwhile the Victoria Hospital for Women and Children, which had been established by a protestant charity and opened at Union Quay in September 1874, moved to Pope's Quay October in October 1876 and then re-located to a site adjacent site to the South Infirmary in September 1885. The two hospitals officially merged as the South Infirmary-Victoria Hospital in 1988. After a name change to South Infirmary-Victoria University Hospital in 2005, the hospital expanded with three new operating theatres being completed in 2012.

References

External links

1762 establishments in Ireland
Hospitals in County Cork
Hospitals established in the 1760s
Health Service Executive hospitals